Ruggero Deodato (7 May 1939 – 29 December 2022) was an Italian film director, screenwriter, and actor.

His career spanned a wide-range of genres including peplum, comedy, drama, poliziottesco, and science fiction, yet he is perhaps best known for directing violent and gory horror films with strong elements of realism. His most notable film is Cannibal Holocaust, considered one of the most controversial and brutal in the history of cinema, which was seized, banned or heavily censored in many countries, and which contained special effects so realistic that they led to Deodato being arrested on suspicion of murder. It is also cited as a precursor of found footage  films such as The Blair Witch Project and The Last Broadcast. The film strengthened Deodato's fame as an "extreme" director and earned him the nickname "Monsieur Cannibal" in France.

Deodato was an influence on film directors like Oliver Stone, Quentin Tarantino and Eli Roth.

Early life and career
Deodato was born in Potenza, Basilicata, and moved to Rome with his family as a child. He went to Denmark and started as a musician playing piano and conducting a small orchestra at 7 years old. Once back to Italy, he quit music after his private teacher sent him away for playing by ear.

Deodato grew up on a farm and at eighteen grew up in the neighborhood where Rome's major film studios are located. Through a friendship with the son of Rossellini, it was there that he learned how to direct under Roberto Rossellini and Sergio Corbucci; he helped to make Corbucci's The Slave and Django as an assistant director. Later on in the 1960s, he directed some comedy, musical, and thriller films, before leaving cinema to do TV commercials. In 1976 he returned to the big screen with his ultra-violent police flick Live Like a Cop, Die Like a Man.

In 1977 he directed a jungle adventure called Last Cannibal World (also known as Jungle Holocaust) starring British actress Me Me Lai with which he 'rebooted' the cannibal film / mondo genre started years earlier by Italian director Umberto Lenzi.

Career

Cannibal Holocaust 
Late in 1979 he returned to the cannibal subgenre with the controversial Cannibal Holocaust. The film was shot in the Amazon Rainforest for a budget of about $100,000, and starred Robert Kerman, Francesca Ciardi, and Carl Gabriel Yorke. The film is a mockumentary about a group of filmmakers who go into the Amazon Rainforest and subsequently stage scenes of extreme brutality for a Mondo-style documentary. During production, many cast and crew members protested the use of real animal killing in the film, including Kerman, who walked off the set.

Deodato created massive controversy in Italy and all over the world following the release of Cannibal Holocaust, which was wrongly claimed by some to be a snuff film due to the overly realistic gore effects. Deodato was arrested on suspicion of murder, and was subsequently forced to reveal the secrets behind the film's special effects and to parade the lead actors before an Italian court in order to prove that they were still alive. Deodato also received condemnation, still ongoing, for the use of real animal torture in his films. Despite the numerous criticisms, Cannibal Holocaust is considered a classic of the horror genre and innovative in its found footage plot structure.

Subsequent career 
Deodato's 1980 film The House on the Edge of the Park was the most censored of the 'video nasties' in the United Kingdom for its graphic violence. His Cut and Run is a jungle adventure thriller, containing nudity, extreme violence and the appearance of Michael Berryman as a crazed, machete-wielding jungle man.

In the 1980s, he made some other slasher/horror films, including Body Count, Phantom of Death and Dial Help. In the 1990s he turned to TV movies and dramas with some success. In 2007, he made a cameo appearance in Hostel: Part II in the role of a cannibal.

Deodato made about two dozen films and TV series, his films covering many different genres, including many action films, a western, a barbarian film and even a family film called Mom I Can Do It. He was also helping to develop a cannibal-themed video game called Borneo: A Jungle Nightmare.

Unrealized projects
Throughout his career, Deodato was attached to a number of projects which either did not come to fruition or, for various reasons, were assigned to other directors. He was initially attached to The New York Ripper (Lucio Fulci), The Last Shark (Enzo G. Castellari), Casablanca Express (Sergio Martino) and Amazonia: The Catherine Miles Story (Mario Gariazzo).

Unmade projects included a snake thriller, Rattles, and a sequel to Cannibal Holocaust entitled Cannibal Fury, which was to enter production in 1983.

Personal life and death 
Deodato was married to actress Silvia Dionisio from 1971 to 1979. He had a son from the marriage. His partner was Micaela Rocco.

In 2019, the filmmaker was honored with a documentary about his life and career called Deodato Holocaust. Directed by Brazilian filmmaker Felipe M. Guerra, it was released in May of that year at the Fantaspoa Film Festival, in Brazil, with the presence of Ruggero. The documentary consists of a series of interviews that Guerra made with the Italian director, edited with images from Deodato's movies and personal photos. In 2021, Deodato Holocaust was released on Blu-Ray in Sweden and Germany – in limited media book format, containing also a 120-page booklet about Deodato's life and career. The documentary was later released in France and the United States, this time as a bonus feature in collector's editions of other films directed by Ruggero.

Deodato died in Rome on 29 December 2022, at the age of 83, from complications of pneumonia, kidney failure, and liver failure.

Filmography

As director
Source(s):

As actor
Source(s):

Video games 
Source(s):

References

Bibliography 
 Harvey Fenton, Julian Grainger, Gian Luca Castoldi, Cannibal Holocaust: And the Savage Cinema of Ruggero Deodato, FAB Press, 1999

External links

 

1939 births
2022 deaths
21st-century Italian male actors
Deaths from kidney failure
Deaths from liver failure
Deaths from pneumonia in Lazio
Giallo film directors
Horror film directors
Italian film directors
Italian male film actors
People from Potenza